Book of Ways, the feeling of strings, is a one-in-a-kind double album of improvised music performed by Keith Jarrett on clavichord recorded in July 1986 and released by ECM Records in 1987.

Making of
As Jarrett stated in an interview with pianist Ted Rosenthal appeared in the Jan-Feb 1997 issue of "Piano and Keyboard magazine", 

In the original notes for the compilation album "Keith Jarrett Selected Recordings", with music selected by Mr. Jarrett himself, he states that:

Reception
For his 2002 "Keith Jarrett Selected Recordings" album review (which contains "Book of Ways" #12, #14 and #18), Peter Marsh at BBC calls it "extraordinary" and that "the results echo back to Baroque's original role as context for improvisation and simultaneously (through the use of unconventional techniques) rockets it forward a few hundred years."

The Allmusic review by Richard S. Ginell awarded the album 3 stars, noting, "Jarrett occasionally tries to stretch the instrument's limited possibilities, hammering percussively on the close-miked strings. Yet for the most part, Jarrett reins in his world-class technique in order to make unpretentiously minimal music on this ancient keyboard. Some of it sounds like folk music, some like new age contemplation, there are convincing neo-baroque musings, and a few of these untitled though numbered selections kick into a higher gear. Sometimes this music is charming; a lot of the time, it gets wearisome. But hey, they also laughed when Keith started putting out massive sets of solo piano..."

Track listing
All music by Keith Jarrett
Disc One:
 "Book of Ways 1" - 9:08   
 "Book of Ways 2" - 3:41   
 "Book of Ways 3" - 4:03   
 "Book of Ways 4" - 4:54   
 "Book of Ways 5" - 2:58   
 "Book of Ways 6" - 4:09   
 "Book of Ways 7" - 3:36   
 "Book of Ways 8" - 5:35   
 "Book of Ways 9" - 5:02   
 "Book of Ways 10" - 3:35   
Disc Two:  
 "Book of Ways 11" - 6:16   
 "Book of Ways 12" - 4:08   
 "Book of Ways 13" - 4:38   
 "Book of Ways 14" - 7:13   
 "Book of Ways 15" - 5:48   
 "Book of Ways 16" - 7:37   
 "Book of Ways 17" - 3:56   
 "Book of Ways 18" - 7:16   
 "Book of Ways 19" - 5:38

Personnel 
 Keith Jarrett – clavichord

Production
 Manfred Eicher - producer
 Martin Wieland - recording engineer
 Kishin Shinoyama - photo
 Barbara Wojirsch - cover design and layout

References 

ECM Records albums
Keith Jarrett albums
1987 albums
Albums produced by Manfred Eicher